Petrey is a town in Crenshaw County, Alabama, United States. The population was 58 at the 2010 census.

Geography
Petrey is located in northeastern Crenshaw County at  (31.850329, −86.207212).

The town of Petrey was named after a man who owned a large cotton plantation. The railroad wanted to use some of his land, and he agreed. The railroad company established a train station on the land, and named it after him.

Demographics

As of the census of 2000, there were 63 people, 28 households, and 15 families residing in the town. The racial makeup of the town was 95.24% White and 4.76% Black or African American. 4.76% of the population were Hispanic or Latino of any race.

There were 28 households, out of which 25.0% had children under the age of 18 living with them, 53.6% were married couples living together (3.6% same-sex couples), 3.6% had a female householder with no husband present, and 42.9% were non-families. 39.3% of all households were made up of individuals, and 17.9% had someone living alone who was 65 years of age or older. The average household size was 2.25 and the average family size was 3.13.

In the town, the population was spread out, with 14.3% under the age of 18, 12.7% from 18 to 24, 22.2% from 25 to 44, 30.2% from 45 to 64, and 20.6% who were 65 years of age or older. The median age was 46 years. For every 100 females, there were 90.9 males. For every 100 females age 18 and over, there were 100.0 males.

The median income for a household in the town was $34,583, and the median income for a family was $50,833. Males had a median income of $26,500 versus $26,000 for females. The per capita income for the town was $20,659. There were no families and 5.4% of the population living below the poverty line, including no under eighteens and 18.2% of those over 64.

References 

Towns in Crenshaw County, Alabama
Towns in Alabama